Ibrahim Al-Helwah (born 18 August 1972) is a Saudi Arabian football goalkeeper who played for Saudi Arabia in the 1994 FIFA World Cup. He also played for Al-Riyadh.

References

1972 births
Saudi Arabian footballers
Saudi Arabia international footballers
Association football goalkeepers
1994 FIFA World Cup players
Living people
Al-Riyadh SC players
Al-Shabab FC (Riyadh) players
Saudi Professional League players
Footballers at the 1994 Asian Games
Asian Games competitors for Saudi Arabia
20th-century Saudi Arabian people
21st-century Saudi Arabian people